The Manhattan Transfer is the second album by The Manhattan Transfer. However, it is the first of four albums to be released by the lineup of Tim Hauser, Laurel Massé, Alan Paul, and Janis Siegel, and the first to establish the sound and style for which the group would become known. It was released on April 2, 1975, by Atlantic Records and was produced by Ahmet Ertegün and Tim Hauser.

This incarnation of the group had been together for three years before this album was released. Ertegün, founder and chairman of Atlantic, attended one of their performances at the New York City cabaret Reno Sweeney. He offered them a contract, which they accepted.

Reviews 

Shaun Considine reviewed the album in May 1975 for The New York Times:

"Vocally, The Manhattan Transfer is one of the slickest group's on today's market. Their intro number, "Tuxedo Junction", is a precise recreation of the 1940 Glenn Miller oldie, with the group's four part vocal harmonies and jazz riffs supplanting the Miller instrumentals. They have done their homework; they have studied their old 78s in detail. In the honors section, "Blue Champagne", a Dorsey beauty, and "Candy" evoke all of the magic and hazy charm of the 30s and 40s."

Charts 
The Manhattan Transfer debuted on Billboard's Top Pop album chart on May 3, 1975, reaching #33.  The single "Operator" went to #22 on Billboard's Hot 100 singles chart.

"Tuxedo Junction" reached #24 on the British pop charts.

Track listing 
 "Tuxedo Junction" (Erskine Hawkins, William Johnson, Buddy Feyne, Julian Dash) - 3:01
 "Sweet Talking Guy" (Doug Morris, Elliot Greenberg) - 2:25
 "Operator" (William Spivery) - 3:09 (derived from "Operator, Operator" by Sister Wynona Carr)
 "Candy" (Mack David, Joan Whitney, Alex Kramer) - 3:26
 "Gloria" (Esther Navarro) - 2:57
 "Clap Your Hands" (Ira Newborn, The Manhattan Transfer) - 2:55
 "That Cat Is High" (J. M. Williams) - 2:53
 "You Can Depend on Me" (Earl Hines, Charles Carpenter) - 3:30
 "Blue Champagne" (Frank Ryerson, Grady Watts, Jimmy Eaton) - 2:21
 "Java Jive" (Milton Drake, Ben Oakland) - 2:44
 "Occapella" (Allen Toussaint) - 3:04
 "Heart's Desire" (Hugh X. Lewis, George Cox, James Dozier, Ralph Ingram, Bernard Purdie) - 2:36

Personnel 
The Manhattan Transfer
 Tim Hauser – vocals, vocal arrangements, arrangements (2)
 Laurel Massé – vocals, vocal arrangements, tambourine (2, 6)
 Alan Paul – vocals, vocal arrangements
 Janis Siegel – vocals, vocal arrangements

Musicians
 Don Grolnick – acoustic piano, electric piano (1, 3, 4, 6, 7, 9, 12), clavinet (2, 11)
 Murray Weinstock – organ (2, 5)
 Richard Tee – organ (3), electric piano (11)
 Ira Newborn – guitar, musical director, conductor, arrangements
 Jerry Friedman – guitar (3, 6, 11)
 Andy Muson – bass guitar (1–9, 11, 12)
 Roy Markowitz – drums (1–9, 11, 12)
 Daniel Ben Zebulon – congas (11)
 Mike Rod – tenor sax solo (1)
 Michael Brecker – tenor sax solo (3)
 Zoot Sims – tenor sax solo (8)
 Gene Orloff – concertmaster (6, 12)
Brass Section
 Clarinets – Phil Bodner, Wally Kane and Seldon Powell
 Alto saxophones – Phil Bodner, Jerry Dodgion, George Dorsey, Harvey Estrin, David Sanborn and George Young
 Baritone saxophones – Lew Del Gatto and Wally Kane
 Tenor saxophones – Michael Brecker, Seldon Powell, Mike Rod and Frank Vicari
 Trombones – Wayne Andre, Garnett Brown, Paul Favlise, Mickey Gravine, Quentin Jackson and Alan Raph
 Trumpets – Randy Brecker, Mel Davis, Jon Faddis, Marky Markowitz, Bob McCoy, Alan Rubin and Marvin Stamm

Production 
 Producers – Tim Hauser and Ahmet Ertegun
 Production Assistance – Geoffrey Haslam and Arif Mardin
 Engineer and Remix – Lew Hahn
 Additional Engineers – Geoffrey Haslam and Gene Paul
 Art Direction – Bob Defrin
 Artwork – Fred Eric Spione
 Liner Photography – David Gahr
 Management – Aaron Russo

References

References / Sources 
 The Manhattan Transfer Official Website
  Retrieved from discogs February 1, 2011

1975 debut albums
The Manhattan Transfer albums
Albums produced by Ahmet Ertegun
Atlantic Records albums
Vocal jazz albums